The Hostess House is a historic house in Palo Alto, California. It was built in 1918 by the YWCA for members of the United States Army to meet their relatives while they were still serving in World War I. The Hostess House was originally located in Camp Fremont.

The building operated as a hostess house from May through October 1918. The house was designed by architect Julia Morgan. It has been listed on the National Register of Historic Places since July 30, 1976. The building moved locations after World War I ended and was repurposed into a municipally sponsored community center, the first in the nation.

References

Houses on the National Register of Historic Places in California
National Register of Historic Places in Santa Clara County, California
Houses completed in 1918